Leona is a female given name derived from the Latin word leo for "lion".

People and fictional characters named Leona include:

People 
Leona (wrestler) (born 1980), Japanese professional wrestler
Leona Aglukkaq, Canadian politician
Leona Brown, American boxer
Leona Cavalli, Brazilian actress
Leona Dalrymple, American author
Leona Dombrowsky, Canadian politician
Leona Florentino, Philippine poet
Leona Gom, Canadian novelist and poet
Leona Graham, British DJ and voiceover artist
Leona Helmsley, American hotel operator and real estate investor
Leona Hutton, American silent film star
Leona Lewis (born 1985), British singer-songwriter
Leona Mitchell, American soprano
Leona Naess (born 1974), British singer-songwriter
Leona Popović (born 1997), Croatian alpine ski racer
Leona Roberts (1879–1954), American stage and film actress
Shishigami Leona, Japanese VTuber
Leona Vidal Roberts (born 1972), Falkland Islands politician
Leona Vaughan (born 1995), Welsh actress
Leona Vicario, Mexican, supporter of the Mexican War of Independence
Leona Woods, American physicist

Fictional characters
Leona Heidern, in The King of Fighters video game series
Leona Ozaki, in Masamune Shirow's Dominion anime and manga series
Leona, the Radiant Dawn, a playable champion character in the multiplayer online battle arena video game League of Legends
Leona, from the TV series Between the Lions
Leaky Leona, a character from the third season of the TV series Codename: Kids Next Door

See also
Leona (disambiguation)
La Leona (disambiguation)
Reona (given name)

References

Feminine given names
English feminine given names
Portuguese given names